Valley Forge was a pivotal winter encampment of the Continental Army during the American Revolutionary War.

Valley Forge may also refer to:

Places
 Valley Forge National Historical Park, (previously Valley Forge State Park), which interprets the encampment
 Valley Forge, Pennsylvania, the small community in southeastern Pennsylvania, that lent the encampment its name
 Valley Forge, York County, Pennsylvania, a small community in south-central Pennsylvania
 Valley Forge State Forest, a former state forest west of Valley Forge, renamed William Penn State Forest
 Valley Forge General Hospital, a military hospital near Phoenixville, Pennsylvania, open from 1950 to 1975
 Valley Forge, Missouri, a ghost town

Education
 Valley Forge Military Academy and College, in Wayne, Pennsylvania
 Valley Forge Christian College, in Phoenixville, Pennsylvania
 Valley Forge High School, in Parma Heights, Ohio
 Valley Forge Academy, a now defunct private school located in Amite, Louisiana

Entertainment
 "Valley Forge" (song), by Iced Earth
 Valley Forge, a fictional spacecraft in the film Silent Running
 Valley Forge, a troop transporter in Robert Heinlein's novel Starship Troopers
 Valley Forge (play), by Maxwell Anderson
 Valley Forge (film), a 1975 TV movie
 Valley Forge, a novel by MacKinley Kantor
 Valley Forge, Valley Forge, the last Punisher comic book storyline by writer Garth Ennis

Other uses
 USS Valley Forge, any of several ships of the US Navy
 Valley Forge Pilgrimage, an annual event of the Boy Scouts of America
 Valley Forge (train), a former Amtrak passenger train